Joseph Duchesne or du Chesne (Quercetan, Latin Josephus Quercetanus) ( 1544–1609) was a French physician. A follower of Paracelsus, he is now remembered for important if transitional alchemical theories. He called sugar toxic, saying: “Under its whiteness, sugar hides a great blackness.”

Biography
Duchesne was born around 1544 in Armagnac and studied at Montpellier, and then at Basle, where he received a medical diploma in 1573. During the 1570s at Lyon, he married Anne Trie the granddaughter of Guillaume Budé, and became a Calvinist convert. He went into medical practice and became physician to Francis, Duke of Anjou.

He left Lyon in 1580 for Kassel in Hesse, and moved on to Geneva, where in 1584 he received citizenship. Duchesne was elected to the Council of Two Hundred in 1587, and undertook diplomatic missions to Bern, Basle, Schaffhausen and Zurich in the years 1589 to 1596. In 1594 he became a member of the Council of Sixty.

In 1598, following the Edict of Nantes, Duchesne returned to France and became physician-in-Ordinary attending Henry IV of France. In 1601 Nicolas Brûlart de Sillery gave him a mission as envoy to the Swiss cantons. In 1604 he went to the court of Maurice of Hesse-Cassel where he gave scientific demonstrations in a laboratory set up for him.

Works 

 1576 : Sclopetarius–On wounds made by muskets and similar weapons
 1603 : De priscorum philosophorum verae medicinae material
 1604 : Ad veritatem hermeticae medicinae ex Hippocratis veterumque decretis ac therapeusi
 1606 :  Tetras gravissimorum totius capitis affectuum, Marburg: Paulus Egenolphus, 1606.  
 1607 : Pharmacopea dogmaticorum
  La farmacopea overo antidotario riformato del signore Giuseppe Quercetano…, translated by Giacomo Ferrari. Venice, 1619
  La pharmacopée des dogmatiques, 2nd ed. with emendations. Rouen: Corneille Pitreson, 1639
 1619 : Le Ricchezze della riformata Farmacopea del Giuseppe Quercetano. Nouamente di Favella Latina traportata in Italiana da Giacomo Ferrari - Venice: Guerigli, 1619.
 1625 : Pharmacopeia restituta - Strassburg: Zetzner, 1625.
 1625 : Diaeteticon polyhistoricum- Strassburg: Zetzner, 1625.
 1625 : Tétrade des plus grièves maladies de tout le cerveau.
 1639 : Traicté familier de l'exacte preparation spagirique des medicamens, Rouen: Corneille Pitreson
 1648 : Quercetanus redivivus, hoc est, ars medica dogmatico-hermetica Vol.1-3 - Francofurti: Beyer, 1648.

Notes

References 
Hirai, Hiro (2010). “The World-Spirit and Quintessence in the Chymical Philosophy of Joseph Du Chesne,” in Chymia: Science and Nature in Medieval and Early Modern Europe (1450–1750), ed. Miguel Lopez-Perez et al. Cambridge: Cambridge Scholars, pp. 247–261.

External links
Online Galleries, History of Science Collections, University of Oklahoma Libraries High resolution images of works by and/or portraits of Joseph Duchesne in .jpg and .tiff format.

1544 births
1609 deaths
16th-century French physicians
Huguenots
16th-century French diplomats
Court physicians